Klimatia (Greek: Κληματιά) may refer to several places in Greece:

Klimatia, Corfu, a village in the island of Corfu 
Klimatia, Ioannina, a village in the Ioannina regional unit